Sutherland is a historic county, registration county and lieutenancy area in the Highlands of Scotland. Its county town is Dornoch. Sutherland borders Caithness and Moray Firth to the east, Ross-shire and Cromartyshire (later combined into Ross and Cromarty) to the south and the Atlantic to the north and west. Like its southern neighbour Ross-shire, Sutherland has some of the most dramatic scenery in Europe, especially on its western fringe where the mountains meet the sea. These include high sea cliffs, and very old mountains composed of Precambrian and Cambrian rocks.

The name Sutherland dates from the era of Norwegian Viking rule and settlement over much of the Highlands and Islands, under the rule of the jarl of Orkney. Although it contains some of the northernmost land in the island of Great Britain, it was called  ("southern land") from the standpoint of Orkney and Caithness. The northeast corner of Sutherland, traditionally known as the Province of Strathnaver, was not incorporated into Sutherland until 1601. This was the home of the powerful and warlike Clan Mackay, and as such was named in Gaelic, the Homeland of Mackay.

Much of the population of approximately 13,000 inhabitants are situated in small coastal towns, such as Helmsdale and Lochinver, which until very recently made much of their living from the rich fishing of the waters around the British Isles. Much of Sutherland is poor relative to the rest of Scotland, with few job opportunities beyond government-funded employment, agriculture and seasonal tourism. Further education is provided by North Highland College, part of the University of the Highlands and Islands. The Ross House Campus in Dornoch was the first establishment in the United Kingdom to provide a degree in golf management. The Burghfield House Campus, also in Dornoch, is the home for the Centre for History teaching undergraduate and postgraduate history degrees to students around the UHI network and worldwide.

Geography

The inland landscape is rugged and very sparsely populated. Despite being Scotland's fifth-largest county in terms of area, it has a smaller population than a medium-size Lowland Scottish town. It stretches from the Atlantic in the west, up to the Pentland Firth and across to the North Sea in the east. The sea-coasts boast very high cliffs and deep fjords in the east and north, ragged inlets on the west and sandy beaches in the north. The east coast contains the sea lochs of Loch Fleet and Dornoch Firth. The remote far northwest point of Sutherland, Cape Wrath, is also the most northwesterly point in Scotland. Several peninsulas can be found along the north and west coasts, most notably Strathy Point, A' Mhòine, Durness/Faraid Head (the latter two formed by the Kyle of Durness, Loch Eriboll and the Kyle of Tongue), Ceathramh Garbh (formed by Loch Laxford and Loch Inchard), and Stoer Head. The county has many fine beaches, a remote example being Sandwood Bay, which can only be reached by foot along a rough track. The number of visiting tourists is, naturally, minimal.

Sutherland has many rugged mountains such as Ben Hope, the most northerly Munro, and Ben More Assynt, the tallest peak in the county at 998 m (3,274 ft). The western part comprises Torridonian sandstone underlain by Lewisian gneiss. The spectacular scenery has been created by denudation to form isolated sandstone peaks such as Foinaven, Arkle, Cùl Mòr and Suilven. Such mountains are attractive for hill walking and scrambling, despite their remote location. Together with similar peaks to the south in Wester Ross, such as Stac Pollaidh, they have a unique structure with great scope for exploration. On the other hand, care is needed when bad weather occurs owing to their isolation and the risks of injury.

There are a large number of inland lochs in the county. The most prominent being:

Owing to its isolation from the rest of the country, Sutherland was reputedly the last haunt of the native wolf, the last survivor being shot in the 18th century. However, other wildlife has survived, including the golden eagle, sea eagle and pine marten amongst other species which are very rare in the rest of the country. There are pockets of the native Scots Pine, remnants of the original Caledonian Forest.

The importance of the county's scenery is recognised by the fact that four of Scotland's forty national scenic areas (NSAs) are located here. The purpose of the NSA designation is to identify areas of exceptional scenery and to ensure its protection from inappropriate development. The areas protected by the designation are considered to represent the type of scenic beauty "popularly associated with Scotland and for which it is renowned". The four NSAs within Sutherland are:
The Assynt-Coigach NSA has many distinctively shaped mountains, including Quinag, Canisp, Suilven, Cùl Mòr, Stac Pollaidh and Ben More Assynt, that rise steeply from the surrounding "cnoc and lochan" scenery.  These can often appear higher than their actual height would indicate due to their steep sides and the contrast with the moorland from which they rise. Assynt lies within Sutherland, whilst Coigach lies within Ross and Cromarty.
 The Dornoch Firth NSA also straddles the boundary between Sutherland and Ross and Cromarty, and covers a variety of landscapes surrounding the narrow and sinuous firth.
 The Kyle of Tongue NSA covers the mountains of Ben Hope and Ben Loyal, as well as woodlands and crofting settlements on the shoreline of the kyle itself.
The North West Sutherland NSA covers the mountains of Foinaven, Arkle and Ben Stack as well as the coastal scenery surrounding Loch Laxford and Handa Island.

Islands 

 A' Chleit
 A' Ghoil-sgeir
 Am Balg
 An Calbh
 An Cruachan
 An Dubh-sgeir
 An Garbh-eilean
 Boursa Island
 Calbha Beag
 Calbha Mòr
 Clach Mhòr na Faraid
 Clobh-sgeir
 Cùl Eilean
 Dubh Sgeir
 Dubh-Sgeir Mhòr
 Dubh Sgeirean
 Duslic
 Eilean a' Bhreitheimh
 Eilean a' Bhuic
 Eilean a' Chaoil
 Eilean a' Chonnaidh
 Eilean a' Ghamhna
 Eilean a' Mhadaidh
 Eilean an Achaidh
 Eilean an Aigeich
 Eilean an Eireannaich
 Eilean an Ròin Beag
 Eilean an Ròin Mòr
 Eilean an t-Sithein
 Eilean Àrd
 Eilean Choraidh
 Eilean Chrona
 Eilean Clùimhrig
 Eilean Dornaidh Oscair
 Eilean Dubh an Teoir
 Eilean Dubh Chal Cinn
 Eilean Dubh Dhrombaig
 Eilean Dubh na Fionndalach Bige
 Eilean Dubh nam Boc
 Eilea Garbh
 Eilean Hoan
 Eilean Iosal
 Eilean Meall a' Chaorainn
 Eilea na h-Aiteig
 Eilean na Coille
 Eilean na Bearachd
 Eilean na Rainich
 Eilean na Saille
 Eilean nam Boc
 Eilean nan Airbhe
 Eilean nan Ròn
 Eilean nan Uan
 Eilean Port a' Choit
 Eilean Rairidh
 Eilean Riabhach
 Eileanan Dubha
 Garbh-eilean
 Glas Leac (several islands with this name)
 Handa Island
 Meall Beag
 Meall Earca
 Meall Mòr
 Meall Thailm
 Na Cluasnadh
 Na Glas Leacan
 Neave Island (also known as Coomb Island)
 Oldany Island
 Ox Rock
 Rabbit Islands
 Seana Sgeir
 Sgarbagh
 Sgeir a' Bhuic
 Sgeir a' Chlaidheimh
 Sgeir an Trilleachain
 Sgeir Iosal
 Sgeir Leathan
 Sgeir Liath
 Sgeir nan Gall
 Sgeir Ruadh
 Sgeirean Cruaidhe
 Sgeirean Glasa
 Soyea Island

Transport

The A9 road main east coast road is challenging north of Helmsdale, particularly at the notorious Berriedale Braes, and there are few inland roads. The Far North Line north-south single-track railway line was extended through Sutherland by the Highland Railway between 1868 and 1871. It enters Sutherland near Invershin and runs along the east coast as far as possible, but an inland diversion was necessary from Helmsdale along the Strath of Kildonan. The line exits to the east of Forsinard.

Helmsdale on the east coast is on the A9 road, at a junction with the A897, and has a railway station on the Far North Line. Buses operate about every two hours Mondays-Saturdays and infrequently on Sundays from Helmsdale to Brora, Golspie, Dornoch, Tain and Inverness in the south, and Berriedale, Dunbeath, Halkirk, Thurso and Scrabster in the north. These are on route X99 and are operated by Stagecoach Group, but tickets can be bought on the Citylink website. Various other Stagecoach buses link the other towns of eastern Sutherland, such as Lairg and Bonar Bridge to Tain and Inverness. The western areas of the county are less well served by public transport, however the Far North Bus company does provided scheduled services connecting Durness to Lairg (bus 806), and from Durness to Thurso via the towns of the north Sutherland coast (bus 803).

There are no commercial airports in the county. There is a small general aviation airstrip south of Dornoch, the former RAF Dornoch, which sees little traffic.

Highland Clearances

Sutherland, like other parts of the Highlands, was affected by the Highland Clearances, the eviction of tenants from their homes and/or associated farmland in the 18th and 19th centuries century by the landowners. Typically, this was to make way for large sheep farms.  The Sutherland Estate (consisting of about two thirds of the county) had the largest scale clearances that occurred in the Highlands, much of this being carried out in 1812, 1814 and 1819–20. In this last period (the largest of the three listed), 1,068 families were evicted: representing an estimated 5,400 people. This population was provided with resettlement in coastal areas, with employment available in fishing or other industries. However, many instead moved to farms in Caithness or left Scotland to emigrate to Canada, the US or Australia.

It was the villages produced by this policy that formed the last Gaelic speaking communities to be found on the east coast of Scotland, as discovered by Nancy Dorian in the early 1960s, and there are still some native speakers of the East Sutherland dialect of Gaelic in this area.

Local government 

In 1890 Sutherland became a local government county, with its own elected county council, under the Local Government (Scotland) Act 1889. At that time, one town within the county, Dornoch, was already well established as an autonomous burgh with its own burgh council. Dornoch, a royal burgh, had its own Burgh Council but did not serve as the county's administrative centre. The County Offices for Sutherland were based at Drummuie in Golspie.

In 1975 the Local Government council and the burgh council were superseded under the Local Government (Scotland) Act 1973. The 1973 act also created a new two-tier system, with Sutherland becoming part of Highland region. The county was divided between districts entitled Caithness and Sutherland, two of the eight districts with Highland. The Tongue and Farr areas of the county of Sutherland became part of the Caithness district (which also included the entirety of the county of Caithness); additionally the Kincardine area of the county of Ross and Cromarty was merged into the new Sutherland district. Shortly after its creation, however the boundary between the districts of Sutherland and Caithness were redrawn to follow that between the counties.

In 1996 local government in Scotland was again reformed, by the Local Government etc (Scotland) Act 1994, which created 32 unitary council areas. The Highland council region became the Highland unitary council area, and the functions of the district councils were absorbed by the Highland Council. The new Highland Council then adopted the former districts as management areas and created a system of area committees to represent them. Until 1999 the Sutherland management and committee areas consisted of seven out of the 72 Highland Council wards. Each ward elected one councillor by the first past the post system of election. In 1999, however, ward boundaries were redrawn, but management area boundaries were not. As a result, area committees were named for and made decisions for areas which they did not exactly represent. The new Sutherland committee area consisted of six out of the 80 new Highland Council wards.

In 2007 new multi-member wards were created for elections under the single transferable vote (STV) electoral system. Some local decisions are delegated to the Sutherland County Committee, which consists of all councillors representing Sutherland.

Civil parishes

In 1894 Parish councils covering rural areas of the county were established. In 1931 the parish councils were superseded under the Local Government (Scotland) Act 1929.

Civil parishes are still used for some statistical purposes, and separate census figures are published for them. As their areas have been largely unchanged since the 19th century this allows for comparison of population figures over an extended period of time.  (Refer to map:)  The following individual parish population figures, giving a total population of 12,650 at the 2011 Census for the 13 Civil Parishes (1930 boundaries), were extracted from Census Table QS112SC using the interactive Standard Outputs system at the Scotland's Census website.

Of the 871 civil parishes in Scotland listed on the General Register Office for Scotland website, 13 are identified on the Wikipedia list of civil parishes in Scotland as being in Sutherland.  In addition, the list states that Reay used to be partly in Sutherland, until 1891.

Assynt: 1,011
Clyne (see Brora): 1,765
Creich: 1,106
Dornoch: 2,402
Durness: 345
Eddrachillis (see Kinlochbervie, Scourie): 674
Farr: 945
Golspie: 1,641 (previously known as Culmallie)
Kildonan (see Helmsdale): 725
Lairg: 887
Loth (see Lothbeg): 139
Rogart: 458
Tongue: 552

Eddrachillis and Tongue were formerly part of Durness parish, being separated in 1724. The other eleven parishes are ancient in origin.

Community councils 
Although created under local government legislation (the Local Government (Scotland) Act 1973) community councils have no statutory powers or responsibilities and are not a tier of local government. They are however the most local tier of statutory representation. Here is a list of Highland Community Councils (scroll to Sutherland). Under the 1973 act, they were created in terms of community council schemes created by the district councils which were created under the same act. The Sutherland district scheme was adopted in 1975. Statutory status for community councils was continued under the Local Government etc (Scotland) Act 1994, and the Sutherland scheme is now the responsibility of the Highland Council.

Settlements

Abandoned Settlements 
Allnabad

Constituency 

The Sutherland constituency of the House of Commons of the Parliament of the United Kingdom represented the county from 1708 to 1918. At the same time however the county town of Dornoch was represented as a component of the Northern Burghs constituency. In 1918 the Sutherland constituency and Dornoch were merged into the then new constituency of Caithness and Sutherland. In 1997 Caithness and Sutherland was merged into Caithness, Sutherland and Easter Ross.

The Scottish Parliament constituency of Caithness, Sutherland and Easter Ross was created in 1999 for the newly established parliament. The constituency was extended for the 2011 election to include more of Ross-shire, and was so renamed Caithness, Sutherland and Ross. In the Scottish Parliament, Sutherland is represented also as part of the Highlands and Islands electoral region.

Sutherland in popular culture
In M. C. Beaton's Hamish Macbeth mystery series, the fictional towns of Lochdubh and Strathbane are located in Sutherland.

Rosamunde Pilcher's last novel Winter Solstice is largely set in and around the fictional Sutherland town of Creagan, located in the Sutherland town of Dornoch.

The ship captained by Horatio Hornblower in C. S. Forester’s book A Ship of the Line is called HMS Sutherland.

The short story Monarch of the Glen by Neil Gaiman is set in Sutherland, and includes a discussion on the origin of the name.

It is still common to refer to the entire Gaelic-speaking world with the phrase "Ó Chataibh go Cléire" (from Sutherland to Cape Clear) or "Ó Chataibh go Ciarraí" (from Sutherland to Kerry). Cléire and Ciarraí are Gaelic-speaking regions in the far south west of Ireland.

Notable people with Sutherland connections
 George Mackay Brown (1921–1996), 'Bard of Orkney', whose mother was born in Strathy
 John Lennon (1940–1980), a frequent visitor to Durness
 Norman MacCaig (1910–1996), Edinburgh born poet, who visited, and wrote about, the region of Assynt, which he visited many times over a period of forty years.
 Patrick Sellar (1780–1851), lawyer and factor
 W.C. Sellar (1898–1951), humourist who wrote for Punch, best known for the book 1066 and All That
 William Young Sellar (1825–1890), classical scholar
 Joe Strummer (1952–2002), frontman of the Clash; born John Graham Mellor in Ankara, Turkey; his mother, Anna Mackenzie, was a crofter's daughter born and raised in Bonar Bridge
 Donald Ross (1872-1948), Golfer and golf course designer, born in Dornoch. Ross's most famous designs are Pinehurst No. 2, Aronimink Golf Club, East Lake Golf Club, Seminole Golf Club, Oak Hill Country Club, Glen View Club, Memphis Country Club, Inverness Club, Miami Biltmore Golf Course and Oakland Hills Country Club; all in the United States of America.

See also
 Subdivisions of Scotland
 Clan Sutherland
 List of counties of Scotland 1890–1975
 Medieval Diocese of Caithness

Footnotes

  Sutherland derives from a Norse perception of the land as  'southern' (Suðrland meaning "Southland"). The Norse referred similarly to the Western Isles as Suðreyjar (the "Southern Isles"), southern in relation to the "Northern Isles" of Orkney, Shetland and the Faroe Islands.
  Sutherland has two main names in the local, indigenous Scottish Gaelic: Cataibh may be used for the whole of Sutherland, but tended historically to apply to the south east, and Dùthaich MhicAoidh (Mackay Country) which was used for the north west, sometimes referred to as Reay Country in English. Cataibh can be read as meaning among the Cats and the Cat element appears as Cait in Caithness. The Scottish Gaelic name for Caithness, however, is Gallaibh, meaning among the Strangers (i.e. the Norse who extensively settled there).

External links

Map of Sutherland on Wikishire
   (www.highland.gov.uk)
Miss Dempster "Folk-Lore of Sutherlandshire" Folk-Lore Journal. Volume 6, 1888.

Bibliography
 

 
Former counties of Scotland
Districts of Scotland
Lieutenancy areas of Scotland
Counties of the United Kingdom (1801–1922)